Philosina alba, the milky flatwing, is a species of damselfly in the family Philosinidae.

The IUCN conservation status of Philosina alba is "VU", vulnerable. The species faces a high risk of endangerment in the medium term.

References

Further reading

 

Calopterygoidea
Articles created by Qbugbot
Insects described in 1999